Nelson Stadium is a multi-purpose outdoor sports facility in Burlington, Ontario. The stadium is owned by the Halton District School Board and is operated by Nelson High School. It is located on New Street, Burlington's south-east district. Its capacity is 1,500 and it is the home venue to the Nelson Lords. The facility is primarily used for Canadian football, soccer, and baseball.

In 2011, a joint project between Halton District School Board and the City of Burlington was announced which resulted in the stadiums renovation. The renovations included aesthetic improvements, purchase of player benches, improved lighting, and refurbishment of media box.  On May 2, 2013, Burlington SC announced the use of Nelson Stadium as their home venue.

References 

Soccer venues in Ontario
Athletics (track and field) venues in Ontario
Multi-purpose stadiums in Canada